Polygonum utahense, the Utah knotweed, is an unresolved name for a putative North American species of plants in the buckwheat family. It has been found only in the States of Utah and Arizona in the southwestern United States.

Stems are green or brown, not wiry. Flowers are pink or white.

References

utahense
Endemic flora of the United States
Flora of Utah
Flora of Arizona
Plants described in 1940
Flora without expected TNC conservation status